"Holes" is a song by British singer-songwriter Passenger. It was released on 15 February 2013 as the third single from his album All the Little Lights. The song with music and lyrics by Mike Rosenberg himself and produced by him and Chris Vallejo initially charted in the Netherlands and later in a number of charts, including the top 20 of the Australian and Irish charts.

Chart performance

References

2013 singles
Passenger (singer) songs
2012 songs